Gregory D. Habeeb (born June 15, 1976) is a lawyer and American politician in Southwest Virginia. He is a conservative Republican and was a member of the Virginia House of Delegates representing the 8th district, which includes the City of Salem, Craig County, and parts of Roanoke and Montgomery Counties from January 2011 to August 31, 2018.

Education
Habeeb was born in Syracuse, New York and was raised in Christiansburg, Virginia. He attended Christiansburg High School and was an active member in the YMCA's Model General Assembly Program. He served as Youth Governor and remained interested in politics.

Habeeb attended Wake Forest University in North Carolina, earning an undergraduate degree in 1998. He earned his Juris Doctor degree from the Wake Forest University School of Law in 2001. While at Wake Forest, he met his future wife, Christy.

Family
Greg and Christy Habeeb have three children and live in Salem, Virginia. He is a partner at Gentry, Locke, Rakes & Moore, a business law firm in Roanoke, Virginia. Habeeb and his family attend the Restoration Church in Salem. Habeeb is a volunteer with Young Life, a youth ministry, and formerly served on the Board of Directors of Big Brothers Big Sisters of Southwest Virginia. He volunteers at the Military Family Support Center in Salem. Habeeb is of Lebanese descent.

Political career
Habeeb got his start in politics during college as intern for then Governor George Allen and subsequently for then Senator John Warner (R-VA). After practicing law in Richmond, Virginia from 2001-2004, Habeeb moved back to the Roanoke Valley. 

In 2007 he was elected Chairman of the Salem Republican Committee.  During his tenure, the Salem Republican Committee grew from about 10 members to over 120 members. His work as Salem Republican Committee Chair was recognized by the Republican Party of Virginia which named him its statewide Unit Chair of the Year in 2007 and the 6th District Unit Chair of the Year in 2008. During this time, Habeeb also worked closely with then Delegate Morgan Griffith, who was the House Majority Leader. In November 2010, Griffith was elected to Congress in Virginia's 9th Congressional District, defeating long-time incumbent Rick Boucher. Griffith resigned from the House of Delegates in December. Habeeb, initially uninterested, reconsidered after receiving calls from many community members and several prominent party officials. 

On July 27, 2018, he announced that he would resign from the House of Delegates effective August 31, 2018, citing a desire to spend more time with his family.

Electoral history

2011 special election
Habeeb announced his candidacy for the Republican nomination for the 8th District seat in the Virginia House of Delegates on November 7, 2010. His candidacy was supported by, among others, Congressman-elect Griffith, 6th District Congressman Bob Goodlatte and Virginia State Senator Ralph Smith.

Habeeb was also endorsed during his primary by Governor Bob McDonnell, Lieutenant Governor Bill Bolling and Attorney General Ken Cuccinelli. Due in part to the overwhelming level of support he received by party leaders and Republican voters, Habeeb ultimately won the Republican nomination without opposition. McDonnell set the date for the special election as January 11, 2011 - giving candidates just under two months to campaign. Habeeb's opponent was Democrat Ginger Mumpower, a business owner from Roanoke County. Habeeb defeated Mumpower by a margin of 64% to 36%, winning every precinct in the District.

2011 re-election

Habeeb announced in April 2011 his intention to seek a full term in the House of Delegates. Habeeb went unchallenged for the Republican nomination and eventually won re-election without opposition.

2013 re-election

In 2013, Habeeb went unchallenged for the Republican nomination and eventually won re-election to a second full term without opposition.

2015 re-election

In 2015, Habeeb went unchallenged for the Republican nomination and eventually won re-election to a third full term without opposition.

2017 re-election
In 2017, Habeeb went unchallenged for the Republican nomination and eventually won re-election to a fourth full term, defeating Democrat Steve McBride, a teacher and scientist who works at Virginia Tech. Habeeb defeated McBride with a margin of 64% to 36%.

Member of the Virginia General Assembly  

Habeeb was sworn-in as a member of the Virginia General Assembly just over 14 hours after thanking his supporters on Election night.

During his first session, Habeeb sponsored several pieces of legislation aimed at reducing the size of government, making it more efficient, transparent and accountable.

He was initially assigned to three committees: House Courts of Justice, House Transportation and House Militia, Police, and Public Safety.

After serving just half a term in the House, Habeeb was appointed to the influential House Committee on Commerce & Labor. In addition, he currently also serves on the Courts of Justice and Privileges and Elections committee. Habeeb was also appointed to the important Rules committee, which is in charge of determining under what rule a bill will be considered under.

Habeeb announced that he would resign his House of Delegates seat on July 27, 2018. He resigned in order to be a full-time dad and take a more significant role at the Gentry Locke law firm.

References 

1976 births
American politicians of Lebanese descent
Living people
Republican Party members of the Virginia House of Delegates
People from Christiansburg, Virginia
Wake Forest University alumni
Wake Forest University School of Law alumni
21st-century American politicians
Politicians from Syracuse, New York
Lawyers from Syracuse, New York